Churchtown is a townland in County Tyrone, Northern Ireland. The town of Castlederg is located within this townland. Many local places and organisations are named after the townland such as the Churchtown Community Centre, Churchtown Football Club and Churchtown Park.

Historic sites 

Two megalithic tombs are known within the townland, a wedge tomb called "Todd's Den" and a portal tomb called "Druid's Altar".

References

Geography of County Tyrone